Arroyo is a Spanish surname. Notable people with the surname include:

Arts
 Carlos Arroyo (architect) (born 1964), Spanish architect
 Eduardo Arroyo (1937–2018), Spanish painter
 Imna Arroyo (born 1951), Puerto Rican artist
 Joe Arroyo (1955–2011), Colombian musician
 Martina Arroyo (born 1937), American soprano

Politics
 Carlos Alberto Arroyo del Río (1893–1969), President of Ecuador from 1940 to 1944
 Carmen E. Arroyo (born 1933), the first Puerto Rican and Hispanic woman elected to the New York State Assembly
 Daniel Arroyo (born 1966), congressman and former social development minister of Argentina
 Felix D. Arroyo (born 1948), city councilor in Boston, Massachusetts, from January 2003 to January 2008
 Gloria Macapagal Arroyo (born 1947), former Speaker of the House of Representatives of the Philippines from 2018 to 2019, President of the Philippines from 2001 to 2010, Vice President of the Philippines from 1998 to 2001
 Iggy Arroyo (1950–2012), member of the Philippine House of Representatives and brother of Jose Miguel Arroyo
 Joker Arroyo (1927–2015), Philippine senator
 Jose Miguel Arroyo (born 1945), former First Gentleman of the Philippines and husband of Gloria Arroyo 
 Mikey Arroyo (born 1969), son of Jose Miguel and Gloria Arroyo
 Dato Arroyo (born 1974), member of the Philippine House of Representatives and son of Jose Miguel and Gloria Arroyo

Sports
 Ángel Arroyo (born 1956), Spanish former cyclist
 Bronson Arroyo (born 1977), American former Major League Baseball pitcher
 Carlos Arroyo (born 1979), Puerto Rican professional basketball player
 Christian Arroyo (born 1995), American Major League Baseball infielder
 David Arroyo (born 1980), Spanish cyclist
 Fernando Arroyo (born 1952), American former Major League Baseball pitcher
 Harold Arroyo (born 1961), Puerto Rican former boxer
 Ignacio Arroyo (basketball) (born 2000), Chilean player
 Lenin Arroyo (born 1979), Costa Rican former boxer
 Luis Arroyo (1927–2016), Puerto Rican Major League Baseball relief pitcher

Other
 Raymond Arroyo (born 1970), Catholic broadcaster
 Sharon Arroyo (born 1966), American applied mathematician and operations researcher
 Von Arroyo (born April 1 19__), Filipino singer

Spanish-language surnames